The Greater Vancouver Open was a professional golf tournament in Canada on the PGA Tour, held in southwestern British Columbia from 1996 to 2002. It was played after the majors in late summer, at the Northview Golf & Country Club in Surrey, a suburb southeast of Vancouver.

History
For its first three years, it was an alternate event in late August, concurrent with the NEC World Series of Golf at Firestone in Akron, Ohio. In 1999, the new Reno-Tahoe Open became the alternate event for the WGC-NEC Invitational at Firestone. The Vancouver tournament was promoted to a regular tour event and scheduled a week later, as the Greater Milwaukee Open moved up to July. Renamed the "Air Canada Championship," sponsored by the country's leading airline, it was coupled with the Canadian Open for consecutive tournaments north of the U.S. border in early September.

Mike Weir won that year for the first of his eight tour wins; he became the first Canadian to win a PGA Tour event on home soil in 

The purses grew substantially during the run of the event, from $1 million to $3.5 million in six years. It was replaced on the schedule in 2003 by the Deutsche Bank Championship in Massachusetts, near Boston.

This was not the first time the PGA Tour included a stop in British Columbia on their schedule. Dow Finsterwald won the unofficial 1955 British Columbia Open Invitational, and Jim Ferree was victorious at the 1958 Vancouver Open Invitational.

Winners

References

External links
Tournament results at GolfObserver.com - select under "Tournament Name"
2002 Tournament preview - at GolfToday.co.uk
Northview Golf & Country Club

Former PGA Tour events
Golf tournaments in British Columbia
Sport in Surrey, British Columbia
Recurring sporting events established in 1996
Recurring sporting events disestablished in 2002
1996 establishments in British Columbia
2002 disestablishments in British Columbia